Boys Meet U is the second Japanese studio album by South Korean boy band Shinee, released on June 26, 2013, in Japan by EMI Records Japan.

Background
A Japanese version of "Sherlock (Clue + Note)" was released in Japan on May 16, 2012, as Shinee's fourth Japanese single. It included the original Japanese song "Keeping Love Again" as a B-side. It was released in two versions, a limited edition that came with a bonus DVD, a 28-page photo booklet, and a trading card, and a regular edition with a poster photo booklet. The single peaked at number two on Oricon's daily and weekly singles charts.

Singles and release
Four of the songs from the album, "Sherlock", "Dazzling Girl", "1000-nen, Zutto Soba ni Ite..." and "Fire", have been released as A-side singles in Japan. A fifth track, "Breaking News", was aired on Tokyo FM during Yamada Hisashi's Radian Limited F. The short version of the music video for the same song was released on June 21, 2013 on Universal Music Japan's official YouTube channel. The album was first announced on  March 25, 2013 & The full list of tracks in the album and their preview in the form of a medley was released on June 23, 2013.

The album was released on June 26, 2013, on online music portal sites for digital download as well as in three different physical versions, regular CD version, a CD + DVD version and a limited edition which contains a CD, a DVD, and a photo book. It was certified Gold by RIAJ for selling 100,000 copies.

Track listing

Charts

Weekly charts

Year-end charts

Release history

References

Shinee albums
SM Entertainment albums
EMI Records albums
Universal Music Japan albums
2013 albums
Japanese-language albums